Jure Leskovec is a Slovenian computer scientist, entrepreneur and associate professor of Computer Science at Stanford University focusing on networks. He was the chief scientist at Pinterest.

Early life and education 
In 2004, Leskovec received a Diploma in Computer Science from the University of Ljubljana, Slovenia, researching semantic networks-based creation of abstracts, using machine learning; in 2008 he received a PhD in Computational and Statistical Learning from the Carnegie Mellon University.

After finishing his PhD, Leskovec worked as a postdoctoral fellow at Cornell University for a year. During this time, he was advised by Jon Kleinberg.

Research and career 
After his postdoctoral stint at Cornell University, Leskovec joined the faculty of Stanford University as an assistant professor in the Department of Computer Science in 2009. He was promoted to associate professor with tenure in 2016.

His general research area is applied machine learning and data science for large interconnected systems. His work focuses on modeling complex, richly-labeled relational structures, graphs, and networks for systems at all scales, from interactions of proteins in a cell to interactions between humans in a society. His research finds applications in a variety of settings including commonsense reasoning, recommender systems, computational social science, and computational biology with an emphasis on drug discovery.

Leskovec co-founded a startup called Kosei in 2014 that was acquired by Pinterest in 2015.

Awards and honors 
 Microsoft Research Faculty Fellowship, 2011. 
 Alfred P. Sloan Fellowship, 2012.
 Lagrange Prize, 2015.

Select publications

References 

Living people
Slovenian computer scientists
Slovenian academics
Sloan Research Fellows
Stanford University faculty
University of Ljubljana alumni
Year of birth missing (living people)
Network scientists
Pinterest people